Peter Cox is the debut solo album from Go West frontman Peter Cox. It features 11 tracks mostly written by Cox and album producer Peter-John Vettese. The album reached No. 64 on the UK Albums Chart.

Track listing
All tracks composed by Peter Cox and Peter-John Vettese; except where indicated.
 "Ain't Gonna Cry Again" 
 "If You Walk Away" (Peter Cox, Peter Lord, V. Jeffrey Smith)
 "Change" 
 "One More Kiss" 
 "I'll Be Good to You" (Peter Cox, David West, Gary Stevenson)
 "Tender Heart" (Peter Cox, Peter Lord, V. Jeffrey Smith)
 "Believe" 
 "Wanting You" 
 "The Enemy" 
 "They Whisper to Me"
 "If You Walk Away" (Cutfather & Joe Remix)

Re-issues
After the June 1998 release of the top 40 hit "What a Fool Believes", the album was re-issued by Chrysalis Records with this cover version added to the track listing.

The album was later re-issued again in 2003 (minus the track "If You Walk Away (Cutfather & Joe Remix)") with the following tracks added, including two covers:

 "In a Better World" 
 "Move On Up"
 "Closer" 
 "Parade" 
 "No Ordinary Day" 
 "Just My Imagination"

References

1997 debut albums
Chrysalis Records albums
Pop albums by English artists